Erlbacher Buildings are two historic commercial buildings located at Cape Girardeau, Missouri.  They were built in 1957–1958, and are two-story, long, narrow, flat-roofed Streamline Moderne style brick buildings with round corners on the façade and horizontal bands of windows.

It was listed on the National Register of Historic Places in 2009.

References

Commercial buildings on the National Register of Historic Places in Missouri
Modernist architecture in Missouri
Commercial buildings completed in 1958
Buildings and structures in Cape Girardeau County, Missouri
National Register of Historic Places in Cape Girardeau County, Missouri